Samuel Lee Jenkins Jr. is an American politician. He served as a Democratic member for the 2nd district of the Louisiana House of Representatives.

In 2016, Jenkins won the election for the 2nd district of the Louisiana House of Representatives. He succeeded Roy A. Burrell. Jenkins assumed his office on January 11, 2016.

References 

21st-century American politicians
Living people
Democratic Party members of the Louisiana House of Representatives
Place of birth missing (living people)
Year of birth missing (living people)